Janek Sternberg (born 19 October 1992) is a German professional footballer who plays as a left-back for VfB Lübeck.

Club career
Sternberg joined Werder Bremen in 2013 from Hamburger SV. After initially playing matches with Werder's reserve team, he made his first team debut in a Bundesliga game against SC Paderborn 07 on 29 November 2014. He played the full game in a 4–0 home win.

On 21 January 2017, Sternberg joined Ferencváros.

In May 2018, 1. FC Kaiserslautern, newly relegated to the 3. Liga, announced Sternberg would join for the 2018–19 season having agreed a contract until 2021.

On 31 January 2020, Sternberg joined Hallescher FC on a deal lasting until the summer of 2021.

Free agent Sternberg moved to VfB Lübeck, placed first in the Regionalliga Nord, in January 2023. He signed a one-year contract with the option of a further year.

International career
Sternberg is a youth international for Germany at the U18 level.

References

External links

Living people
1992 births
German footballers
Association football fullbacks
Germany youth international footballers
Bundesliga players
3. Liga players
Nemzeti Bajnokság I players
Ferencvárosi TC footballers
SV Werder Bremen players
SV Werder Bremen II players
1. FC Kaiserslautern players
Hallescher FC players
VfB Lübeck players
German expatriate footballers
German expatriate sportspeople in Hungary
Expatriate footballers in Hungary